Hagerstown is the name of several places in the United States of America:
Hagerstown, Indiana
Hagerstown, Maryland
Hagerstown Metropolitan Area
Hagerstown, Ohio